is a Japanese retired football player who played as a midfielder.

Career
Previously he played for Latvian side FK Liepājas Metalurgs. Akahoshi had a great season with Metalurgs. Soon after joining the team he became a vital figure in its first eleven and made several excellent appearances. He scored his first goal for Liepāja in a league match victory (4-2) over FK Ventspils on August 22, 2010. All in all he played 15 matches in the LMT Virsliga, scoring 6 times and becoming the fourth top scorer in Metalurgs' team. He also played 1 domestic cup match, when Metalurgs were beaten by FK Jelgava and 1 Champions League qualification match, when Metalurgs were once again beaten - this time by Sparta Praha from the Czech Republic. He was also included in the LMT Virsliga 2010 team of the season. The club finished the league in the third place and he got a bronze medal. After that season he was released by Metalurgs, as the club intended that he had to play in a bit higher level the next year. In January 2011 he joined Pogoń Szczecin.

Ufa
In July 2014, Akahoshi signed a three-year contract with Russian Premier League side FC Ufa, making his debut as a half-time substitute against Zenit St.Petersburg on 16 August 2014. After only three appearances for Ufa, Akahoshi rejoined Pogoń Szczecin on loan until the end of the 2014–15 season in February 2015. On 8 June 2015, Akahoshi left Ufa by mutual consent.

Pogoń Szczecin Again
On termination of his deal with FC Ufa Akahoshi immediately rejoined Pogoń Szczecin.

Arema FC
On August 24, 2019. Arema inaugurated Takafumi Akahoshi as the new player to replace the vacancy in their Asian foreign player slot. He made his debut in a 1–1 home draw against PSIS Semarang on 31 August, appearing as a second-half substitute.

Club statistics

Honours

Club
Urawa Red Diamonds
J1 League: 2006
Emperor's Cup: 2005, 2006

References

External links

 
 

1986 births
Living people
Association football people from Shizuoka Prefecture
Japanese footballers
Japanese expatriate footballers
J1 League players
J2 League players
Japan Football League players
Urawa Red Diamonds players
Mito HollyHock players
Montedio Yamagata players
Zweigen Kanazawa players
FK Liepājas Metalurgs players
Ekstraklasa players
Pogoń Szczecin players
Takafumi Akahoshi
Takafumi Akahoshi
Expatriate footballers in Thailand
Japanese expatriate sportspeople in Thailand
Expatriate footballers in Latvia
Japanese expatriate sportspeople in Latvia
Japanese expatriate sportspeople in Poland
Expatriate footballers in Poland
FC Ufa players
Russian Premier League players
Expatriate footballers in Russia
Association football midfielders
Expatriate footballers in Iran
Persian Gulf Pro League players